Samuel Gallu (March 21, 1918 – March 27, 1991) was an American writer and producer and director of film and television. He is also sometimes credited as Sam Gallu.

Selected filmography
 Navy Log (1955–58, TV)
 The Man Outside (1967)
 Theatre of Death (1967)
 The Limbo Line (1968)
 Arthur? Arthur! (1969)
 Give 'em Hell, Harry! (1975)

References

Bibliography 
 Huckvale, David. A Green and Pagan Land: Myth, Magic and Landscape in British Film and Television. McFarland, 2018.
 Hyatt, Wesley. Short-Lived Television Series, 1948–1978: Thirty Years of More Than 1,000 Flops. McFarland, 2015.

External links 
 

1918 births
1991 deaths
American film directors
American television directors
American film producers
People from Woodbine, New Jersey
Television producers from New Jersey